Kent Vaughn Flannery (born 1934) is a North American archaeologist who has conducted and published extensive research on the pre-Columbian cultures and civilizations of Mesoamerica, and in particular those of central and southern Mexico.  He has also published influential work on origins of agriculture and village life in the Near east, pastoralists in the Andes, and cultural evolution, and many critiques of modern trends in archaeological method, theory, and practice. At the University of Chicago he gained his B.A. degree in 1954; the M.A. in 1961 and a Ph.D. in 1964. From 1966 to 1980 he directed project “Prehistory and Human Ecology of the Valley of Oaxaca, Mexico.” dealing with  the origins of agriculture, village life, and social inequality in Mexico. He is James B. Griffin Professor in the Department of Anthropology at the University of Michigan. In 2005, he was elected to the American Philosophical Society.

Major publications

 Flannery, Kent V.  (1972)  The Cultural Evolution of Civilizations. Annual Review of Ecology and Systematics 3:399-426.
 Flannery, Kent V. (editor)  (1976)  The Early Mesoamerican Village. Academic Press, New York.
 Flannery, Kent V.  (1985)  Guila Naquitz: Archaic Foraging and Early Agriculture in Oaxaca, Mexico. Academic Press, New York.
 Flannery, Kent V.  (2006)  On the Resilience of Anthropological Archaeology. Annual Review of Anthropology 35:1-13.
 Flannery, Kent V. and Joyce Marcus (editors)  (1983)  The Cloud People: Divergent Evolution of the Zapotec and Mixtec Civilizations. Academic Press, New York.
 Flannery, Kent V. and Joyce Marcus  (1994)  Early Formative Pottery in the Valley of Oaxaca. Memoirs vol. 27. Museum of Anthropology, University of Michigan, Ann Arbor.
 Flannery, Kent V. and Joyce Marcus  (2005)  Excavations at San José Mogote 1: The Household Archaeology. Memoirs vol. 40. Museum of Anthropology, University of Michigan, Ann Arbor.
 Hole, Frank/Flannery, Kent V./Neely, James A.(1969) Prehistory and human ecology of the Deh Luran plain. An early village sequence from Khuzistan, Iran. Memoirs of the Museum of Anthropology, University of Michigan 1. Ann Arbor.
 Marcus, Joyce and Kent V. Flannery  (1996)  Zapotec Civilization: How Urban Society Evolved in Mexico's Oaxaca Valley. Thames and Hudson, New York.

Fiction
 Flannery, Kent V. "The Golden Marshalltown: A Parable for the Archeology of the 1980s." American Anthropologist, New Series, Vol. 84, No. 2 (Jun., 1982)

References

External links
 

Living people
Members of the United States National Academy of Sciences
1934 births
Mesoamerican archaeologists
Olmec scholars
Mixtec scholars
Zapotec scholars
American Mesoamericanists
American archaeologists
20th-century Mesoamericanists
21st-century Mesoamericanists
University of Michigan faculty
Members of the American Philosophical Society